Sir Robert de Hellewell was a member of the Folville Gang that slew the corrupt Baron of the Exchequer, Sir Roger de Beler and was Rutland's MP in 1340.

Career

Robert was certified as one of the Lords of Whissendine, Rutland in 1316.

In 1322 he was summoned to perform military service against the Scottish but could not be found at his manor house at Whissendine being retained by William la Zouch, 1st Baron Zouche of Haryngworth.

On 24 January 1326 an arrest warrant was issued to apprehend those involved in the murder of the corrupt Baron of the Exchequer and ardent supporter of the Despencers, Sir Roger de Beler, who had been killed going from Kirby Bellars to Leicester. On 1 March a warrant was issued that named Sir Robert de Hellewell as one of the gang and his land and goods were seized on 24 March.

Robert represented Rutland in the Parliament of January 1340.

References

Bibliography
 
 
 
 

Year of birth unknown
English MPs 1340
Medieval English criminals
English outlaws
Recipients of English royal pardons
People from Whissendine
History of Rutland
1285 births
Year of death unknown
14th-century criminals